Fever Records is a New York City record label of the 1980s, founded by promoter Sal Abbatiello.

The label was marketed and distributed by Sutra Records until the latter went under, which precipitated a distribution deal with Russell Simmons's RAL division of Def Jam Recordings.

Fever Records is best known for the recording artists The Cover Girls, Lissette Melendez and Lil Suzy. The releases distributed by Sutra are now controlled by Warlock Records/Traffic Entertainment group.

See also
List of record labels

References

External links
Official Company website

American record labels
Electronic dance music record labels
Pop record labels